Xanthomonas populi is a species of bacteria.

References 

Xanthomonadales